Vunipola Fifita (born 28 February 1996 in Tonga) is an Australian rugby union player who plays for the Brumbies in Super Rugby. His playing position is prop. He has signed for the Brumbies squad in 2019. He came to Australia from his native Tonga to attend Newington College (2012 – 2014) at the age of 15.

Reference list

External links
Rugby.com.au profile
itsrugby.co.uk profile

1996 births
People educated at Newington College
Australian rugby union players
Living people
Rugby union props
Tonga international rugby union players
Tongan rugby union players
Canberra Vikings players
ACT Brumbies players
New South Wales Waratahs players